There are 54 prisons in Bolivia which incarcerated 16,613 people . Approximately 70% of prisoners have yet to receive their sentences, and are either awaiting trial, or presently on trial.

The prisons are managed by the Penitentiary Regime Directorate. There are 17 prisons in departmental capital cities (including their metropolitan regions) and 36 provincial prisons. The Defensor del Pueblo consider pre-trial detainees as people deprived of their right to liberty. The prison population is growing rapidly; it was previously around 8,700 people as of 2010. Overcrowding is at a serious level, with the total prison population at three times the capacity of the prisons. An investigative survey by the Defensor del Pueblo of 20 rural prisons found that they lack the basic infrastructure necessary to function humanely. Due to the overcrowding of prisons in Bolivia and as part of a program that aims to spread literacy, inmates have now access to a small library where they can read books to reduce their jail time.

Urban prisons include San Pedro Prison and Chonchocoro Prison in La Paz, and San Sebastian Prison in Cochabamba and Palmasola Prison in Santa Cruz.

References

External links 
 Hacinómetro (Overcrowding-meter), interactive map of Bolivia's prison population